Antes de perder is a Spanish streaming television miniseries set in Galicia directed by Sonia Méndez which stars Esther Acebo and Mariam Hernández. Produced by RTVE in collaboration with Cósmica Producións, it was released on Playz in March 2019.

Premise 
An action series displaying feminist themes and comedy elements, the fiction develops as a sort of road movie, following Jana and Diana, two very different women in their 30s who embark into an adventure throughout Galician roads with no turning back while forging a strong friendship.

Cast 
 Esther Acebo as Diana
 Mariam Hernández as Jana
 Manuel Manquiña as Comisario Méndez
  as Cabo Fontán
  as Luis
  as Fernando
  as Casilda
 Carolina Iglesias (Percebes y grelos) as Yennifer
 Alberto Rolán as Charly
  as Sargento Lestedo
  as Enfermero 1
  as Enfermero 2

Production and release 
Produced by RTVE in collaboration with Cósmica Producciones, Antes de perder began filming in Galicia by early July 2018. It became the first Galician-produced Playz original series. Consisting of 7 episodes of around 15 minutes, the series was fully released on Playz on 7 March 2019. Nati Juncal was credited as producer whereas Lucía Catoira worked as director of photography.

Awards and nominations 

|-
| align = "center" | 2020 || 18th Mestre Mateo Awards || colspan = "2" | Best Web Series ||  || 
|}

References 

Spanish television miniseries
Spanish-language television shows
Playz original programming
2019 Spanish television series debuts
2019 Spanish television series endings
Spanish action television series
Television shows filmed in Spain
Television shows set in Galicia (Spain)
2010s Spanish drama television series
2010s Spanish comedy television series
Works about friendship